Pacifism has manifested in the United States in a variety of forms (such as peace movements), and in myriad contexts (such as opposition to the Civil War and to nuclear weapons).  In general, it exists in contrast to an acceptance of the necessity of war for national defense.

Colonial era
Antiwar activity in the colonial era was limited to certain churches.

Peace churches
In Colonial Pennsylvania several small German religious sects, especially the Church of the Brethren, Mennonites, and Amish were Peace churches. They clung to the antiwar positions they had developed in Europe. They minimized contact with the larger society.  From the 1780s to the mid-19th century the Shakers attracted attention for their commitment to peace. They practiced celibacy but recruited heavily and numbered about 4000.

Quakers

Much more influential in the long-run was the growing pacifism of the Quakers. They were eager and able to proclaim their message widely. They controlled Pennsylvania politics until they refused to fight the native Americans who were allied with the French enemy and attacking frontier farms. They therefore gave up power in 1755. During the American Revolution (1775-1783) their general policy was neutrality between the King and Congress, to not serve in the army, and not to pay war taxes. Quaker intellectuals and activists played a major role in developing an anti-war Peace Position and spreading the word in the new nation. In the Civil War (1861-1865), the destruction of slavery was a higher priority than pacifism. About a fourth of young Quakers fought in the army, and most supported the Civil War with taxes.

War of 1812

Opposition to the War of 1812 was intense in New England, and rare in the South and West.  Many New Englanders opposed the conflict on political, economic, and religious grounds. Britian was leading a coalition against Napoleon that waged from 1793 to 1815. The Jeffersonian Republicans under presidents Thomas Jefferson (1801-1809) and James Madison (1809-1817) were hostile to both sides. Britain used its powerful Royal Navy to seize American sailors and impress them into its ranks, and cut off American exports to France. Jefferson tried to  use the Embargo Act of 1807 to gain leverage by making exports illegal. This badly hurt the New England economy;  smuggling exports into Canada resulted. Britain refused to rescind the Orders in Council (1807). Jeffersonian war hawks led by Henry Clay and John Calhoun demanded war with Britain. Madison obliged in an effort to maintain American rights and honor in what contemporaries called, "The second war for independence." 

Vehement protests against "Mr. Madison's War" erupted in e Federalist Party strongholds in New  England. Three governors refused to place their state militias under federal control for duty outside the territory of their respective states. In the ensuing 1812 and 1813 United States House of Representatives elections, eight sitting New England congressmen were rejected by the voters, and several others saw the writing on the wall and declined to seek re-election. There was a complete turnover of the New Hampshire delegation.

Organizing a peace movement
The war ended in February 1815. The first movement in the United States was the New York Peace Society, founded in 1815 by theologian David Low Dodge, followed by the Massachusetts Peace Society. The groups merged into the American Peace Society, which held weekly meetings and produced literature that was spread as far as Gibraltar and Malta describing the horrors of war and advocating pacifism on Christian grounds.

Civil War

After the election of Abraham Lincoln in November 1861, the Deep South cotton states led by South Carolina, seceded from the union and established a new Confederate States of America. A civil war was imminent, and a large fraction of public opinion, especially in the north, decried the horrors of an imminent war with massive depth suffering and destruction. The peace movement had weakened greatly in the 1850s, as it used violence to stop the return of runaway slaves and supported the violence in Kansas. Remaining pacifists called for peaceful separation, as did many prominent civic leaders of both parties North and South. Merle Curti notes the traditional rhetoric of pacifism was seldom heard. Instead the pacifists said non-violence only applied to international affairs. They tolerated or engaged in violence to defend the nation, repress insurrection, and free the slaves.  With the Confederate artillery attack on Fort Sumter in April 1861, the mood in the North decisively changed, bringing a hyperpatriotic emphasis on defending the United States in the name of American nationalism. The abolitionist movement had long contained a powerful pacifist element, led by William Lloyd Garrison. After Sumter the abolitionists called for an intensive total war to destroy slavery once and for all. The peace movement, had weakened in the 1850s and was no practically dead, apart from a large faction of Quakers. For the rest of 1861 opposition to the war, in both North and South, was scattered and often violent; it was based on politics not pacifism.

Arbitration movement 1890s-1914

The U.S. and Great Britain were pioneers in the use of arbitration to resolve their differences. It was first used in the Jay Treaty of 1795 negotiated by John Jay, and played a major role in the Alabama Claims case of 1872 whereby major tensions regarding British support for the Confederacy during the Civil War were resolved.  At the First International Conference of American States in 1890, a plan for systematic arbitration was developed, but not accepted. The Hague Peace Conference of 1899 saw the major world powers agree to a system of arbitration and the creation of a Permanent Court of Arbitration.  
Arbitration was widely discussed among diplomats and elites in the 1890–1914 era.  The 1895 dispute between the United States and Britain over Venezuela was peacefully resolved through arbitration. Both nations realized that a mechanism was desirable to avoid possible future conflicts. The Olney-Pauncefote Treaty of 1897 was a proposed treaty between the United States and Britain in 1897 that required arbitration of major disputes.  The treaty was rejected by the U.S. Senate and never went into effect.

Arbitration treaties of 1911–1914 
President William Howard Taft (1909–1913) was a major advocate of arbitration as a major reform of the Progressive Era.  In 1911 Taft and his Secretary of State Philander C. Knox negotiated major treaties with Britain and with France  providing that differences be arbitrated. Disputes had to be submitted to the Hague Court or other tribunal. These were signed in August 1911 but had to be ratified by a two thirds vote of the Senate. Neither Taft nor Knox consulted with members of the Senate during the negotiating process. By then many Republicans were opposed to Taft, and the president felt that lobbying too hard for the treaties might cause their defeat. He made some speeches supporting the treaties in October, but the Senate added amendments Taft could not accept, killing the agreements. 

The arbitration issue opens a window on a bitter philosophical dispute among progressives. One faction, led by Taft, looked to legal arbitration as the best alternative to warfare.  Taft was a constitutional lawyer who later became Chief Justice; he had a deep understanding of the legal issues.  Taft's political base was the conservative business community which largely supported peace movements before 1914. However, his mistake in this case was a failure to mobilize that base. The businessmen believed that economic rivalries were cause of war, and that extensive trade led to an interdependent world that would make war a very expensive and useless anachronism.  

However, an opposing faction of progressives, led by ex-president Theodore Roosevelt, ridiculed arbitration as foolhardy idealism, and insisted on the realism of warfare as the only solution to serious disputes. Taft's treaties with France and Britain were killed by Roosevelt, who had broken with his protégé Taft in 1910. They were dueling for control of the Republican Party. Roosevelt worked with his close friend Senator Henry Cabot Lodge to impose those amendments that ruined the goals of the treaties.  Lodge thought the treaties impinge too much on senatorial prerogatives.  Roosevelt, however, was acting to sabotage Taft's campaign promises. At a deeper level, Roosevelt truly believed that arbitration was a naïve solution and the great issues had to be decided by warfare. The Rooseveltian approach had a near-mystical faith of the ennobling nature of war. It endorsed jingoistic nationalism as opposed to the businessmen's calculation of profit and national interest.

Although no general arbitration treaty was entered into, Taft's administration settled several disputes with Great Britain by peaceful means, often involving arbitration. These included a settlement of the boundary between Maine and New Brunswick, a long-running dispute over seal hunting in the Bering Sea that also involved Japan, and a similar disagreement regarding fishing off Newfoundland.

Secretary of State William Jennings Bryan (1913–1915), a leading Democrat, worked energetically to promote international arbitration agreements. His efforts were negated by the outbreak of World War I. Bryan negotiated 28 treaties that promised arbitration of disputes before war broke out between the signatory countries and the United States. He made several attempts to negotiate a treaty with Germany, but ultimately was never able to succeed. The agreements, known officially as "Treaties for the Advancement of Peace," set up procedures for conciliation rather than for arbitration.  Arbitration treaties were negotiated after the war, but attracted much less attention than the negotiation mechanism created by the League of Nations.

World War I

There is a very large scholarly literature on opposition to the war in 1914-1917.

There is less on opposition in 1917-1918, and focuses on repression of the antiwar left by the government On women see

1920s and 1930s

League of Nations debate
see: Warren F. Kuehl, and Lynne Dunn, Keeping the covenant: American internationalists and the League of Nations, 1920-1939 (Kent State University Press, 1997).

Naval disarmament

While many peace activists in the 1920s were disappointed that the U.S. never joined the League of Nations of the World Court, they did support American leadership in achieving a major reduction in naval weapons among the leading powers.  The Washington conference was heavily promoted by the major peace groups: the World Peace Foundation; the American Association for International Conciliation; the Carnegie Endowment for International Peace; the Women's Peace Society; the Women's World Disarmament Committee; the Women's International League for Peace and Freedom, and the Federal Council of Churches of Christ in America.    

At the end of World War I, the United States had the largest navy and one of the largest armies in the world. With no serious threat to the United States itself, the White House presided over the disarmament of the navy and the army. The army shrank to 140,000 men, while naval reduction was based on a policy of parity with Britain. Seeking to prevent an arms race, Senator William Borah won passage of a congressional resolution calling for a 50 percent reduction of the American Navy, the British Navy, and the Japanese Navy. With Congress's backing, Harding and Hughes began preparations to hold a naval disarmament conference in Washington. The Washington Naval Conference convened in November 1921, with representatives from the U.S., Japan, Britain, France, Italy, China, Belgium, the Netherlands, and Portugal--but not Germany (which had no navy) or the Soviet Union. Secretary of State Charles Evans Hughes assumed a primary role in the conference and made the pivotal proposal—the U.S. would reduce its number of warships by 30 if Great Britain decommissioned 19 ships and Japan decommissioned 17 ships.  A journalist covering the conference wrote that "Hughes sank in thirty-five minutes more ships than all of the admirals of the world have sunk in a cycle of centuries."

The conference produced six treaties and twelve resolutions among the participating nations. The United States, Britain, Japan, and France reached the Four-Power Treaty, in which each country agreed to respect the territorial integrity of one another in the Pacific Ocean. Those four powers as well as Italy also reached the Washington Naval Treaty, which established a ratio of battleship tonnage that each country agreed to respect. In the Nine-Power Treaty, each signatory agreed to respect the Open Door Policy in China, and Japan agreed to return Shandong to China. The treaties only remained in effect until the mid-1930s, however, and ultimately failed. Japan eventually invaded Manchuria and the arms limitations no longer had any effect. The building of "monster warships" resumed and the U.S. and Great Britain were unable to quickly rearm themselves to defend an international order and stop Japan from remilitarizing.

Kellogg–Briand Pact

The Kellogg–Briand Pact – officially the General Treaty for Renunciation of War as an Instrument of National Policy is a 1928 international agreement on peace in which signatory states promised not to use war to resolve "disputes or conflicts of whatever nature or of whatever origin they may be, which may arise among them". The plan was devised by American lawyers Salmon Levinson and  James T. Shotwell, and promoted by Senator William E. Borah.                                                                                                                                                                                                      

The pact was signed in August 1928 by fifteen nations: Australia, Belgium, Canada, Czechoslovakia, France, Germany, Great Britain, India, the Irish Free State, Italy, Japan, New Zealand, Poland, South Africa, and the United States. Another 47 soon joined.  Sponsored by France and the U.S., the Pact is named after its authors, United States Secretary of State Frank B. Kellogg and French foreign minister Aristide Briand. The pact was concluded outside the League of Nations and remains in effect today.  It formally condemned “recourse to war for the solution of international controversies.” It put into effect the long-standing pacifist goal that interstate wars be declared a violation of international law.  The axhievement was recognized when Briand and Kellogg were jointly awarded the Nobel Peace Prize in 1929. 

A common criticism is that the Kellogg–Briand Pact did prevent wars--but that was not its object. It was unable to prevent the Second World War but it was the base for trial of Nazi leaders in 1946. They were executed as punishment for violating Kellogg-Briand. Furthermore, declared wars became very rare after 1945. Realists have ridiculed  it for its moralism and legalism.  Nevertheless, the pact served as the legal basis for the concept of a crime against peace, for which the Nuremberg Tribunal and Tokyo Tribunal tried and executed the top leaders responsible for starting World War II.

Similar provisions to those in the Kellogg–Briand Pact were later incorporated into the Charter of the United Nations and other treaties, which gave rise to a more activist American foreign policy which began with the signing of the pact.

World War II

In the 1930s influential theologian Reinhold Niebuhr rejected overly idealist pacifism as "perverse sentimentality," in favor of just war.

Public opinion

In a Gallup poll conducted in the opening days of the war (September 1 to September 6, 1939), Americans were asked if the US should "declare war on Germany in support of England, France and Poland and should deploy forces to assist those countries." They gave a strong "No!," with 90% saying no and 8% saying yes. In a separate question from the same poll, respondents were asked what level of assistance should be given to the British, Polish and French. When asked about selling food, 74% agreed while 27% disagreed; for sending airplanes "and other war materials" to the United Kingdom and France 58% would agree with 42% disagreeing; when asked if army and naval forces should be deployed "abroad" to fight Germany 16% said yes with 84% saying no. 

During the stalemated "Phoney War" (October 1939 to spring 1940), public opinion in the US was strongly opposed to entering the war against Germany waged by Britain and France. A poll in March 1940 found that 96 percent of Americans were against going to war with Germany.

Opposition elements

The Communist Party opposed American involvement in the early stages of World War II, starting in August 1939, when the Molotov–Ribbentrop Pact launched a deal between Stalin and Hitler that allowed Moscow to split control of Eastern Europe with Berlin. Communist activists in CIO labor unions tried to slow the flow of munitions to Britain. Leftist organizations like the American Peace Mobilization and veterans of the Abraham Lincoln Brigade protested in opposition to the war, the draft, and the Lend-Lease Act.  They said of Lend-Lease, "Roosevelt needs its dictatorial powers to further his aim of carving out of a warring world, the American Empire so long desired by the Wall Street money lords." Overnight on June 22, 1941, the date of the German invasion of the Soviet Union, the Communists reversed positions and became war hawks.

Numerous women activists, notably within the Mothers' movement led by Elizabeth Dilling, opposed American involvement on the basis that it would be preferable for Nazism rather than Communism to dominate Europe.  These women also wished to keep their own sons out of the combat US involvement in the war would necessitate, and believed the war would destroy Christianity and further spread atheistic Communism across Europe.

Henry Ford, a long-time pacifist, opposed US participation in the war until the attack on Pearl Harbor. Before then he refused to manufacture airplanes and other war equipment for the British. Father Charles Coughlin urged the US to keep out of the war and permit Germany to conquer Great Britain and the Soviet Union. Asked Coughlin, "Must the entire world go to war for 600,000 Jews in Germany?" The most radical of isolationists would say that all of the current problems in the US were because of World War I. US Senator Gerald Nye from North Dakota would even blame the Great Depression on America's economic expansion during World War I.

Isolationism was strongest in the United States, where oceans separated it on both sides from the war fronts. The German-American Bund even marched down the avenues of New York City demanding isolationism.  The isolationists, led by the America First Committee, were a large, vocal, and powerful challenge to President Roosevelt's efforts to enter the war.  Charles Lindbergh was perhaps the most famous isolationist.  Isolationism was strongest in the Midwest with its strong German-American population.

Students at UC Berkeley in 1940 led a large protest in opposition to the war. The Keep America Out of War Committee (KAOWC) from its founding on March 6, 1938 until when the America First Committee formed in the fall of 1940 it was the only nationwide organization to oppose any foreign intervention and President Roosevelt's foreign policy. The KAOWC was for most of its lifetime composed of 6 pacifist groups apart from the Socialist Party of America: The Peace Section of the American Friends Service Committee (ALSC), Fellowship for Reconciliation (FOR), World Peace Commission of the Methodist Church, American Section of the Women's International League for Peace and Freedom (WIL), National Council for the Prevention of War (NCPW and the War Resisters League (WRL). After the Attack on Pearl Harbor, the KAOWC would end up dissolving.

With the Pearl Harbor attack in December 1941, nearly all the noninterventionist elements quickly switched to support the war..

Cold War: 1947–1989

Korean War

American opposition to the Korean War (1950–1953) came primarily from the small far–left group the American Peace Crusade, formed in 1951. It gained little support. However the high-casualty stalemate in 1951–52 came under increasing political attack from the Republican Party and especially from its 1952 presidential candidate Dwight D. Eisenhower.

Vietnam War

The anti-Vietnam War peace movement began during the 1960s in the United States, opposing U.S. involvement in the Vietnam War. Some within the movement advocated a unilateral withdrawal of American forces from South Vietnam.

Opposition to the Vietnam War aimed to unite groups opposed to U.S. anti-communism, imperialism, capitalism and colonialism, such as New Left groups and the Catholic Worker Movement. Others, such as Stephen Spiro, opposed the war based on the just war theory.

In 1965, the movement began to gain national prominence. Provocative actions by police and protesters turned anti-war demonstrations in Chicago at the 1968 Democratic National Convention into a riot. News reports of American military abuses such as the 1968 My Lai massacre brought attention (and support) to the anti-war movement, which continued to expand for the duration of the conflict.

High-profile opposition to the Vietnam war turned to street protests in an effort to turn U.S. political opinion against the war. The protests gained momentum from the civil rights movement, which had organized to oppose segregation laws. They were fueled by a growing network of underground newspapers and large rock festivals, such as Woodstock. Opposition to the war moved from college campuses to middle-class suburbs, government institutions, and labor unions.

1980s

Near the end of the Cold War, U.S. peace activists focused on slowing the nuclear arms race in the hope of reducing the possibility of nuclear war between the U.S. and the USSR. As the Reagan administration accelerated military spending and adopted a tough stance toward Russia, the Nuclear Freeze campaign and Beyond War movement sought to educate the public on the inherent risk and ruinous cost of Reagan's policy. Outreach to individual citizens in the Soviet Union and mass meetings using satellite-link technology were major parts of peacemaking activity during the 1980s. In 1981, the activist Thomas began the longest uninterrupted peace vigil in U.S. history. He was later joined at Lafayette Square in Washington, D.C. by anti-nuclear activists Concepción Picciotto and Ellen Thomas.

1990s
In response to Iraq's invasion of Kuwait in 1990, President George H. W. Bush began preparing for war in the region. Peace activists were starting to gain traction with popular rallies, especially on the West Coast, just before the Gulf War began in February 1991. The ground war ended in less than a week with a lopsided Allied victory, and a media-incited wave of patriotic sentiment washed over the nascent protest movement.

During the 1990s, peacemaker priorities included seeking a solution to the Israeli–Palestinian impasse, humanitarian assistance to war-torn regions such as Bosnia and Rwanda, and aid to post-war Iraq. American peace activists brought medicine into Iraq in defiance of U.S. law, resulting in heavy fines and imprisonment for some. The principal groups involved included Voices in the Wilderness and the Fellowship of Reconciliation.

2001 Afghanistan War

Iraq War

Historiography
According to Charles De Benedetti:  In the American manner, peace history is less a field than a clearing where different practitioners of diplomatic, social, religious, cultural, and intellectual history have come together to consider why, how, and with what effect various people have worked in the past to extend peace as a central ordering process in human relations. 

See also Howlett, Charles F. "Studying America's Struggle against War: An Historical Perspective." The History Teacher 36.3 (2003): 297-330. and Wingate, Jennifer. "Real art, war art, and the politics of peace memorials in the United States After World War I." Public Art Dialogue 2.2 (2012): 162-189. [absence of stridently pacifist imagery in memorials of 1920; deep divisions and angry debates among artists]

See also
 Peace movement in the United States
 List of peace activists
 List of anti-war organizations in the United States
 
 Carnegie Endowment for International Peace (est. 1910)
 Pacifism in Germany
 Christian pacifism

References

Bibliography

Published in 20th century
 
 

 Robert Moats Miller. (1956) "The Attitudes of the Major Protestant Churches in America Toward War and Peace, 1919–1929," The Historian 19#1 pp 15–26.
 Staughton Lynd, ed. Nonviolence in America: A Documentary History (Bobbs Merrill, 1966).

 
 
 Charles Chatfield (1971). For peace and justice: Pacifism in America, 1914-1941 (University of Tennessee Press), a major scholarly survey.
 Mantell, Matthew Edwin. "Opposition to the Korean War: A study in American dissent" (PhD dissertation,  New York University ProQuest Dissertations Publishing, 1973. 7319947).

 

 Charles De Benedetti. "Peace History, in the American Manner" The History Teacher 18#1 (Nov., 1984), pp. 75-110 
 Lawrence S. Witner (1984). Rebels against war: The American peace movement, 1933-1983 (Temple University Press) online

 

  
 Guenter Levy. Peace and Revolution: the moral crisis of American pacifism (Eerdman's, 1988). critical evaluation of the work of four major pacifist organizations: the American Friends Service Committee; Fellowship of Reconciliation; Women's International League for Peace and Freedom; War Resisters League

1990s
 
 R.C. Peace III (1991). A just and lasting peace: The US peace movement from the Cold War to desert storm (Noble Press, Chicago)
 John Whiteclay Chambers, ed. (1992) The Eagle and the Dove: The American Peace Movement and United States Foreign Policy, 1900-1922 (Syracuse University Press0 online

 Charles Chatfield (1992). The American peace movement: Ideal and activism (New York)
 
 
 
 
 
 C. Smith (1996). Resisting Reagan: The US-Central America peace movement. (University of Chicago Press)
 Warren F. Kuehl, and Lynne Dunn, (1997)Keeping the covenant: American internationalists and the League of Nations, 1920-1939 (Kent State University Press)
 
 
 
 Peter Brock, and Nigel Young. Pacifism in the Twentieth Century (Syracuse University Press, 1999).

Published in 21st century

2000s
 
 

 C.F. Howlett (2005). History of the American peace movement 1890-2000: The emergence of a new scholarly discipline Edwin Mellen Press, New York
 

 
 George C. Herring. From Colony to Superpower: U.S. Foreign Relations since 1776. (Oxford UP, 2008).

2010s
 Young, Nigel, ed. The Oxford International Encyclopedia of Peace (4 vol. Oxford UP) global coverage; online in Oxford Reference;  publisher blurb 

 Robert Mann, ed. Wartime Dissent in America: A History and Anthology (Palgrave Macmillan, 2010) excerpt 

 
 

 

 
 
  (About the 1940s-1970s)
 
 
 Richard Fanning, (2014) Peace and Disarmament: Naval Rivalry and Arms Control, 1922-1933 (University Press of Kentucky) online

 Michael Kazin. (2017) War Against War: The American Fight for Peace, 1914-1918 (Simon and Schuster). online
 Mitchell K. Hall, ed. (2018) Opposition to War: An Encyclopedia of U.S. Peace and Antiwar Movements (2 vol. ABC-CLIO), thorough coverage

Primary sources
 Lynd, Staughton, and Alice Lynd, eds. Nonviolence in America: A documentary history (3rd ed. Orbis Books, 2018).
 Stellato, Jesse, ed. Not in Our Name: American Antiwar Speeches, 1846 to the Present (Pennsylvania State University Press, 2012). 287 pp

External links